Mr. America may refer to:

 Mr. America (film), a 2013 Italian film
 Mr. America (contest), American bodybuilding contest
 "Mr. America" Gene Stanlee, a professional wrestler in the early 1900s
 Mr. America, a character played by Hulk Hogan in WWE in 2003
 Mr American, a 1980 novel by George MacDonald Fraser
 Mister America (comics), three characters
 Mister America (Jeffrey Graves), a fictional superhero in the DC Comics Universe
 Mister America (Tex Thompson), a fictional superhero in the DC Comics Universe
 Harmon Mister America, 1970s American single-seat light sports aircraft
 Mr America (song), a song by Russell Morris, (1970)
 Mr America (EP), an EP by Russell Morris, 1972
 Mister America, a 2019 film associated with the On Cinema at the Cinema web series

See also

 Mr. and Mrs. America, a 1945 War Bonds promotion